Gura Șuții is a commune in Dâmbovița County, Muntenia, Romania. It is composed of two villages, Gura Șuții and Speriețeni.

Geography
The commune is located in the central-southern area of the county, south of the county seat, Târgoviște, on the right bank of the Dâmbovița River. It is crossed by the county roads DJ721 and DJ721A, which connect it to Târgoviște, Costeștii din Deal, and Cuparu.

References

Communes in Dâmbovița County
Localities in Muntenia